Jitotol is a town and one of the 119 Municipalities of Chiapas, in southern Mexico.

As of 2010, the municipality had a total population of 18,683, up from 13,076 as of 2005. It covers an area of 203.7 km².

As of 2010, the town of Jitotol had a population of 4,427. Other than the town of Jitotol, the municipality had 63 localities, the largest of which (with 2010 populations in parentheses) were: Carmen Zacatal (2,579), Las Maravillas (2,105), Cálido (1,189), and El Ámbar (1,157), classified as rural.

References

Municipalities of Chiapas
Chiapas Highlands